The Deserted River is a short river in the Jervis Inlet region of the South Coast of British Columbia, Canada, flowing in a short course generally southwest into the eastern "elbow" of that inlet, to the southeast of Malibu, British Columbia.  The river was named in association with the location of its outlet, Deserted Bay, which was named in 1860 by the British Admiralty.  The name derives from a deserted village of the Shishalh (Sechelt) people on the south shore of the bay, who fled the area after attacks by grizzly bears, abandoning the village.  Its previous name was Tsuahdie, meaning "place to shelter".

Approximately 13 km (8 mi) in length, the river and its east fork, Tsuahdi Creek, drain the western flank of the mountain spine between the Jervis Inlet drainage and that of the Elaho River to the east, and its length includes the 1.2 km (0.7 mi) length of the unofficially-named Deserted Lake.  Issuing from the lake at its south end, the river plunges , with additional cascades in addition to the main falls totalling .  The cascade, which is not officially named and is formally unmeasured, is known as Deserted River Falls.

See also
List of rivers in British Columbia
List of waterfalls of Canada
Alfred Creek Falls

References

Rivers of the Pacific Ranges
South Coast of British Columbia
Waterfalls of British Columbia
New Westminster Land District